Liu Li (born 6 August 1986) is a Chinese Paralympic athlete who competes in the F32 category. Liu won a gold medal at the 2020 Summer Paralympics in the club throw with a world record of 45.39. He also won a gold medal in the shot put with a WR of 12.97. He won a gold medal at the 2019 World Para Athletics Championships in the shot put.

Notes

External links
 

1986 births
Living people
Sportspeople from Tangshan
Male club throwers
Chinese male shot putters
Paralympic athletes of China
Medalists at the 2020 Summer Paralympics
Paralympic gold medalists for China
Paralympic medalists in athletics (track and field)
Athletes (track and field) at the 2020 Summer Paralympics